Lipaugus is a genus of birds in the family Cotingidae.

Taxonomy
The genus was introduced in 1828 by the German zoologist Friedrich Boie in 1828. Boie spelled the genus name as Lipangus but this was corrected to Lipaugus. The name comes from the Greek lipaugēs, meaning "dark" or "devoid of light". The type species was designated by George Gray in 1840 as the screaming piha.

The genus contains nine species.

Two former Lipaugus species are now in the genus Snowornis. The dusky, chestnut-capped, cinnamon-vented, and scimitar-winged pihas may form a superspecies.

References

 
Bird genera
Taxonomy articles created by Polbot